Vito Hammershøy-Mistrati (born 15 June 1992) is a Danish professional footballer who plays as a midfielder for Allsvenskan club IFK Norrköping.

Career
Hammershøy-Mistrati progressed through FC Midtjylland's academy after joining from KB in 2007, but did not make his breakthrough into the first team. He joined Næstved in 2011 where he began his professional career. In the June 2012, he moved to HB Køge.

On 24 July 2014, Hammershøy-Mistrati signed a one-year contract with Lyngby. This contract was extended in December until 2017. In February 2016, his contract with Lyngby Boldklub was terminated by mutual consent. A few days later, it was announced that he was moving to FC Helsingør. His contract was extended in July of the same year, where he signed a one-year extension keeping him at Helsingør until 2017.

In July 2017, he joined Danish Superliga club Hobro IK. He made his debut at the top level on 16 July 2017, starting against his former side Helsingør on the first matchday of the 2017–18 season, as Hobro won 2–1. On 10 December, he stood out in the league match against FC Nordsjælland, providing two assists for Quincy Antipas in a 3–2 loss.

Hammershøy-Mistrati joined Randers FC on 6 July 2019, signing a four-year contract. He made his debut for the club on 14 July, the first matchday of the 2019–20 season, starting in a 2–1 loss to SønderjyskE. He won his first trophy at the end of the 2020–21 season season, as Randers beat SønderjyskE by 4–0 in the Danish Cup final. In the game, he provided an assist to Simon Piesinger. In January 2022, he was named team captain after Erik Marxen's departure to Nordsjælland.

On 8 June 2022, Hammershøy-Mistrati signed with Romanian club CFR Cluj. After six months in Romania, Hammershøy-Mistrati left the club and signed a deal until the end of 2025 with Swedish Allsvenskan club IFK Norrköping.

Personal life
Hammershøy-Mistrati was born in Denmark to parents of Danish and Italian heritage. He is the son of journalist .

Honours
Randers
Danish Cup: 2020–21

CFR Cluj
Supercupa României runner-up: 2022

References

1992 births
Living people
Footballers from Copenhagen
Danish people of Italian descent
Danish men's footballers
Danish expatriate men's footballers
Association football midfielders
Danish Superliga players
Danish 1st Division players
Liga I players
Næstved Boldklub players
HB Køge players
Lyngby Boldklub players
FC Helsingør players
Hobro IK players
Randers FC players
CFR Cluj players
IFK Norrköping players
Expatriate footballers in Romania
Expatriate footballers in Sweden
Danish expatriate sportspeople in Romania
Danish expatriate sportspeople in Sweden